Danielithosia is a genus of tiger moths in the family Erebidae.

Species
 Danielithosia aureolata (Daniel, 1954)
 Danielithosia consimilis Dubatolov, Kishida & Wang, 2012
 Danielithosia difficilis Dubatolov, Kishida & Wang, 2012
 Danielithosia fuscipennis Dubatolov, Kishida & Wang, 2012
 Danielithosia hoenei Dubatolov, 2013
 Danielithosia immaculata (Butler, 1880)
 Danielithosia limayca (Daniel, 1954)
 Danielithosia mesospila (Fang, 2000)
 Danielithosia milina (Fang, 1982)
 Danielithosia pallens (Inoue, 1980)
 Danielithosia zolotuhini Dubatolov, 2012

References

  2013: A new species and new combinations of Danielithosia from eastern China and Indochina, with check-list of the genus (Lepidoptera: Arctiidae: Lithosiinae). Acta Entomologica Musei Nationalis Pragae 53 (1): 381-386. Full Article
 

Lithosiina
Moth genera